Cladova may refer to several places in Romania:

 Cladova, a village in Păuliș Commune, Arad County
 Cladova, a village in Bethausen Commune, Timiș County
 Cladova (Bega), a tributary of the Bega River in Timiș County
 Cladova (Mureș), tributary of the Mureș River in Arad County

See also 
 Kladovo, a town and municipality in the Bor District of eastern Serbia known as Cladova in Romanian